Herbiconiux flava is a non-endospore-forming and non-motile bacterium from the genus of Herbiconiux which has been isolated from the phyllosphere of the grass-plant Carex.

References

Microbacteriaceae
Bacteria described in 2012